Jim Ouliaris (born 22 July 1966) was an Australian assistant referee. He gained his FIFA accreditation in 2002 and retired from all forms of refereeing in 2007.

Ouliaris attended both the 2003 and 2005 FIFA Confederations Cups. He was in charge of Football Federation Victoria's Talented Officials Program (TOP). This program is now the Victorian Talent Pool. He was an assistant referee in the A-League and also the now defunct National Soccer League. He teaches at Cantebury Girls Secondary College in Melbourne.

References

Living people
1966 births